Voyage to Isis is the second album by industrial band Delta-S, released in December, 2007 on WindM Records. The songs "The Phoenix Effect", "Denial", "Wastelands", "Erase", "Rapture of the Deep" and "Waiting for the Sunrise" can all currently be heard on the band's MySpace page.

Track listing
All songs written by Lyte except where noted.

"Damage Control" – 7:32
"Wastelands" (Lyte, DJ Amanda Jones) – 4:29
"My Crusade" (Lyte, Lucien) – 5:17
"Waiting for the Sunrise" (Lyte, Emilee Seeger) – 4:50
"The Summoning of the Sea" (Lauren Edman, Lyte) – 6:19
"Anomaly" – 4:50
"Erase" – 5:30
"The Phoenix Effect" (Lyte, Kirsty Hawkshaw) – 7:57
"Denial" – 3:45
"Rapture of the Deep" – 4:02
"Tempest" – 4:57
"Star·Kindler" (Lyte, Hawkshaw) – 3:38
"Isis" (Lyte, Lucien) – 6:40
"Epilogue" – 2:00

Credits
All vocals performed by Lyte except where noted.

Track 1: Co-produced with Ever. Vocals by Lyte, Michelle Averna, and Nikki Williams.
Track 2: Vocals by DJ Amanda Jones.
Track 3: Co-produced with Nicki Tedesco.
Track 5: Co-produced with Lauren Edman. Vocals by Lauren Edman.
Track 7: Vocals by Lyte and Sheri Shaw.
Track 8: Co-produced with Kirsty Hawkshaw. Vocals by Kirsty Hawkshaw and Lyte.
Track 9: Vocals by Colleen Kelly and Lyte.
Track 11: Vocals by Lyte and DJ Amanda Jones.
Track 12: Co-produced with Kirsty Hawkshaw. Vocals by Kirsty Hawkshaw.

Personnel
Lyte – vocals, keys, guitar
Lucien – guitar, vocals
Colleen Kelly – vocals
DJ Amanda Jones – vocals
Nicki Tedesco – bass, upright bass, vocals, guitar
Tony Bandos – drums

References 

2007 albums
Delta-S albums